Jørund Henning Rytman (born 4 May 1977) is a Norwegian Progress Party politician representing  Buskerud in the Storting. He was first elected in 2005.

Storting committees
2013–2017 member of the Business and Industry committee
2009–2013 member of the Finance and Economic Affairs committee
2005–2009 member of the Finance and Economic Affairs committee

External links

Fremskrittspartiet - Biography
Rytman.no - Official Homepage

Progress Party (Norway) politicians
Members of the Storting
1977 births
Living people
Norwegian Christians
21st-century Norwegian politicians